Manalur State assembly constituency is one of the 140 state legislative assembly constituencies in Kerala. It is also one of the 7 state legislative assembly constituencies included in the Thrissur Lok Sabha constituency. As of the 2021 assembly elections, the current MLA is Murali Perunelly of CPI(M).

Local self governed segments
Thaikkad Gram panchayat which was included in Manalur constituency as per 2008 delimitation was merged with the Guruvayur Municipality in 2010.

Manalur Niyamasabha constituency is composed of the following local self-governed segments:

Members of Legislative Assembly 
The following list contains all members of Kerala legislative assembly who have represented the constituency:

Key

Election results

Niyamasabha Election 2021

Niyamasabha Election 2016 
There were 2,11,930 registered voters in the constituency for the 2016 election.

Niyamasabha Election 2011 
There were 1,74,161 registered voters in the constituency for the 2011 election.

References

State assembly constituencies in Thrissur district
Assembly constituencies of Kerala